The 1934 FA Charity Shield was the 21st FA Charity Shield, a football match between the winners of the previous season's First Division and FA Cup competitions. The match was contested by league champions Arsenal and FA Cup winners Manchester City, and was played at Highbury, the home ground of Arsenal. Arsenal won the game, 4–0.

Match details

References

1934
Charity Shield 1934
Charity Shield 1934
Comm
Charity Shield
Charity Shield